Barnettia may refer to:
 Barnettia (hydrozoan), a genus of hydrozoans in the family Pandeidae
 Barnettia, a genus of funguses in the family Chaetothyriaceae, synonym of Microcallis
 Barnettia, a genus of plants in the family Bignoniaceae, synonym of Santisukia